Hurmudar (also Romanized as Hūrmūdar; also known as Hermoodar Bala, Hermūdar, Hurmūdar Bāla, Hūrmūrd, and Khvormehdān-e Bālā) is a village in Isin Rural District, in the Central District of Bandar Abbas County, Hormozgan Province, Iran. At the 2006 census, its population was 644, in 159 families.

References 

Populated places in Bandar Abbas County